The Arizona attorney general is the chief legal officer of the State of Arizona, in the United States. This state officer is the head of the Arizona Department of Law, more commonly known as the Arizona Attorney General's Office. The state attorney general is a constitutionally-established officer, elected by the people of the state to a four-year term. The state attorney general is second (behind the Secretary of State) in the line of succession to the office of Governor of Arizona. 

Headed by the attorney general of Arizona, the Arizona Attorney General's Office is the largest law office in the state, with approximately 400 attorneys and 1,000 employees. , the Attorney General's Office is divided into the following divisions:
 Executive Office
 Solicitor General
 Operations
 Child and Family Protection
 State Government Division
 Civil Litigation Division
 Criminal

Qualifications
The Arizona Constitution requires all of the officers in the state's executive department, including the attorney general, to be at least 25 years old, a U.S. citizen for 10 years and an Arizona resident for five years.

Arizona law further requires the attorney general to have been a "practicing attorney before the supreme court of the state" for at least five years before taking office, however the Arizona Supreme Court ruled the law unconstitutional during the appointment process of Jack LaSota in 1977; LaSota had not renewed his state bar membership and was therefore not considered a practicing attorney.

Powers and duties 
While the state constitution establishes the office of Attorney General, it does not prescribe the powers of the office. Instead, the Arizona Constitution expressly provides that the powers and duties of the state attorney general are to be prescribed by the Arizona State Legislature. In pursuance of this constitutional mandate, the Arizona Legislature has prescribed that, under A.R.S. §41-193(A)(1) – §41-193(A)(8), the attorney general of Arizona, through the Arizona Department of Law, shall:
 Prosecute and defend in the state supreme court all proceedings in which the state or an officer thereof is a party ~ A.R.S. §41-193(A)(1);
 Under certain conditions, prosecute and defend any proceeding in all other courts of the state, in which the state or an officer thereof is a party or has an interest ~ A.R.S. §41-193(A)(2);
 Represent the state in any action in a federal court ~ A.R.S. §41-193(A)(3);
 Exercise supervisory powers over county attorneys ~ A.R.S. §41-193(A)(4);
 Under certain conditions, assist any county attorney in the discharge of their duties ~ A.R.S. §41-193(A)(5);
 Maintain a docket of all proceedings in which the attorney general is required to appear ~ A.R.S. §41-193(A)(6);
 Issue attorney general opinions on questions of law to  state officers and agencies ~ A.R.S. §41-193(A)(7); and
 Perform other duties prescribed by law ~ A.R.S. §41-193(A)(8).

Arizona Attorneys General

Arizona Territory

State of Arizona 
Parties

References

External links
 Arizona Attorney General Opinions
 Arizona Attorney General official website
 Arizona Attorney General articles at ABA Journal
 News and Commentary at FindLaw
 Arizona Revised Statutes at Law.Justia.com
 U.S. Supreme Court Opinions – "Cases with title containing: State of Arizona" at FindLaw
 State Bar of Arizona
 Arizona Attorney General Mark Brnovich profile at National Association of Attorneys General
 Press releases at Arizona Attorney General's office